Kurgan West was an air base in Russia located 25 km west of Kurgan.  It was probably active during the 1950s and 1960s and is now abandoned; the remnants are almost completely gone.

References
Russian Airfields.com

Soviet Air Force bases
Buildings and structures in Kurgan Oblast